, provisional designation: , is a trans-Neptunian object from the outermost region of the Solar System, locked in a 4:7 orbital resonance with Neptune. It was discovered on 17 April 1999, by astronomers at the Kitt Peak Observatory, Arizona, in the United States. , it has not been named.

Discovery 
 was first observed on the night of 17 April 1999, by astronomers using the 4-meter Nicholas U. Mayall Telescope at Kitt Peak National Observatory in Arizona. The observing astronomers were Robert Millis, James Elliot, Matthew Holman, Mark Wagner as well as Kim Falinski. Follow-up observations with the Nordic Optical Telescope at the Roque de los Muchachos Observatory, La Palma, Spain, were made three weeks later. The body's observation arc begins with its official discovery observation at Kitt Peak on 17 April 1999.

Orbit and classification 

This minor planet orbits the Sun at a distance of 38.7–49.0 AU once every 290 years and 7 months (106,124 days; semi-major axis of 43.87 AU). Its orbit has an eccentricity of 0.12 and an inclination of 5° with respect to the ecliptic. , it is at 39.7 AU from the Sun with an apparent magnitude of 23.42, and will come to perihelion in 2047.

 is a resonant trans-Neptunian object that stays in a 4:7 mean-motion orbital resonance with Neptune, orbiting exactly four times the Sun for every seven orbits Neptune does and are therefore protected from the planets scattering effect. The classification is deemed secure. The 4:7 resonance is located in the midst of the classical objects of the Kuiper belt, a circumstellar disc of otherwise non-resonant bodies, contrary to the more prominent resonant plutinos (2:3) and twotinos (1:2) which form the inner and outer rim of the Kuiper belt, respectively.

Numbering and naming 

This minor planet was numbered by the Minor Planet Center on 16 November 2005, receiving the number  in the minor planet catalog. , it has not been named. According to the established naming conventions, it will be given a mythological name associated with the underworld or with creation.

Physical characteristics 

A red surface color is typically associated with the presence of tholins, polymer-like organic compounds, formed by long exposures to solar and cosmic radiation.

As of 2021, no rotational lightcurve for this body has been obtained from photometric observations. Its rotation period, pole and shape remain unknown.

References

External links 
 List of Transneptunian Objects, Minor Planet Center
 (118378) 1999 HT11, Small Bodies Data Ferret
 Discovery Circumstances: Numbered Minor Planets (115001)-(120000), Minor Planet Center
 
 

118378
118378
19990417